The Tehosa-class (テホサ) locomotives were a class of steam tender locomotives of the Chosen Government Railway (Sentetsu) with 4-6-0 wheel arrangement. The "Teho" name came from the American naming system for steam locomotives, under which locomotives with 4-6-0 wheel arrangement were called "Ten Wheeler".

After the Liberation of Korea, of the 178 surviving locomotives of all Teho classes - including six previously owned by private railway companies - 106 went to the Korean National Railroad in the South, and 72 to the Korean State Railway in the North.

Description
Whilst the first two classes of 4-6-0 locomotives in Korea, the Tehoi and Tehoni classes, were built by Baldwin, Sentetsu turned to a different American manufacturer for the third class - ALCo's Brooks Works built nine such locomotives for Sentetsu in 1911. Intended for long-range mixed trains, they were initially numbered 222–230, and subsequently were renumbered 651–659 in 1918. After being rebuilt with superheaters in the 1930s, they were redesignated テホサ (Tehosa) class and numbered テホサ1 through テホサ9 in the 1938 general renumbering. One final unit, テホサ10, was built by Gyeongseong Works in 1938.

Postwar

Korean National Railroad 터우3 (Teou3) class
The exact dispersal of the ten Tehosa-class locomotives after the partition of Korea in 1945 and the division of Sentetsu assets in 1947 is uncertain, but at least two went to the South, where the Korean National Railroad designated them 터우3 (Teou3) class  and were used primarily on branchline trains.

Korean State Railway 더우서 (Tŏusŏ) class
Having been assigned primarily to the Manpo Line, most of the class went to the North after the partition, where they were designated 더우서 (Tŏusŏ) class by the Korean State Railway, but little is known of their service lives and subsequent fates.

Construction

References

Locomotives of Korea
Locomotives of South Korea
Locomotives of North Korea
Railway locomotives introduced in 1911
4-6-0 locomotives
ALCO locomotives